The Octagon is a multi-purpose conference centre and business venue in Pasig, Metro Manila, 
Philippines. Situated within the business center of Ortigas, it rises up to 20 floors high and is the biggest home for 
Teleperformance support in the Philippines.

References

1. Map of G/F, Octagon Centre, San Miguel Avenue, Ortigas Center, Pasig, Philippines
- See more at: http://nearbyph.com/location/14.582191/121.060432/gf-octagon-centre-san-miguel-avenue-ortigas-center-pasig-city-philippines#sthash.bvEtclAm.dpuf

Skyscraper office buildings in Metro Manila
Convention and exhibition centers in Metro Manila
Skyscrapers in Ortigas Center